Great Horton is a ward of the City of Bradford, West Yorkshire, England, with a population of 17,683 at the 2011 Census.

Great Horton is west of Bradford and east of the village of Clayton and also includes Scholemore, Paradise Green, Lidget Green and Pickles Hill. Horton Bank Bottom, Horton Bank, and to some extent itself extends into neighbouring wards.

Councillors 
Great Horton electoral ward is represented on Bradford Council by three Labour Party councillors, Joanne Dodds, Tariq Hussain and Abdul Jabar.

 indicates seat up for re-election.
 indicates a by-election.

See also
Listed buildings in Bradford (Great Horton Ward)

References

External links 
 BBC;  Local Elections 2007: BRADFORD; Accessed 6 Nov 2008
 BCSP (Internet Explorer only)
 BBC election results
 Council ward profile (pdf)

Wards of Bradford
Areas of Bradford